Juan Ignacio Panzariello Cambre (born 8 July 1990) is a Uruguayan footballer who plays as a forward for Sud América in the Uruguayan Segunda División.

References

External links

1990 births
Living people
Uruguayan footballers
Uruguayan expatriate footballers
Racing Club de Montevideo players
Huracán F.C. players
Central Español players
Canadian Soccer Club players
Rampla Juniors players
Cienciano footballers
Sud América players
Uruguayan Primera División players
Uruguayan Segunda División players
Peruvian Segunda División players
Association football forwards
Expatriate footballers in Guatemala
Expatriate footballers in Peru
Uruguayan expatriate sportspeople in Peru
Uruguayan expatriate sportspeople in Guatemala